Apteronotus rostratus is a species of apteronotid electric fish. These fish typically exhibit a wide diversity of skull shapes, ranging from highly elongate skulls to highly foreshortened ones, with both types evolving independently multiple times.  In Apteronotus rostratus and some others, such as Compsaraia samueli, mature males grow extremely elongated snouts and oral jaws which are used in agonistic interactions with other males. This is an example of sexual weaponry. A study comparing skull shape and jaw-closing performance in males and females of Apteronotus rostratus suggested that males with elongated faces for use in fights did not have lower mechanical advantages, in contrast to the similar species Compsaraia samueli in which males exhibit a trade-off between sexual weaponry and jaw leverage.

References

Taxa named by Seth Eugene Meek
Taxa named by Samuel Frederick Hildebrand
Fish described in 1913
Apteronotidae